Ardeadoris  tomsmithi is a species of sea slug, a dorid nudibranch, a shell-less marine gastropod mollusk in the family Chromodorididae.

Distribution 
This species is found in the tropical Pacific Ocean, from Hawaii to the Marshall Islands, Okinawa and Western Australia.

References

Chromodorididae
Gastropods described in 1989